Transparent Things may refer to:

 Transparent Things (album), a 2006 album by Fujiya & Miyagi
 Transparent Things (novel), a 1972 novel by Vladimir Nabokov